Diplacella is a genus of fungi in the family Gnomoniaceae.

References

External links
Diplacella at Index Fungorum

Gnomoniaceae
Sordariomycetes genera